This is a list of cooling towers above 500 ft / 150 m.

List of tallest cooling towers
 indicates a structure that is no longer standing.

See also 
 List of tallest buildings and structures

References 

Cooling towers
Cooling towers